The 1916 Boston College football team was an American football team that represented Boston College as an independent during the 1916 college football season. Led by first-year head coach Charles Brickley, Boston College compiled a record of 6–2.

Schedule

References

Boston College
Boston College Eagles football seasons
Boston College football
1910s in Boston